Reputation management, originally a public relations term, refers to the influencing, controlling, enhancing, or concealing of an individual's or group's reputation.  The growth of the internet and social media led to growth of reputation management companies, with search results as a core part of a client's reputation.  Online reputation management, sometimes abbreviated as ORM, focuses on the management of product and service search engine results.  Ethical grey areas include mug shot removal sites, astroturfing customer review sites, censoring complaints, and using search engine optimization tactics to influence results.  In other cases, the ethical lines are clear; some reputation management companies are closely connected to websites that publish unverified and libelous statements about people.  Such unethical companies charge thousands of dollars to remove these posts – temporarily – from their websites.

This field of public relations has developed extensively, with the growth of the internet and social media the advent of reputation management companies.  The overall outlook of search results has become an integral part of what defines "reputation" and reputation management now exists under two spheres: online and offline reputation management.

Online reputation management focuses on the management of product and service search results within the digital space, that is why it is common to see the same suggested links in the first page of a Google search.  A variety of electronic markets and online communities like e-Bay, Amazon and Alibaba have ORM systems built in, and using effective control nodes these can minimize the threat and protect systems from possible misuses and abuses by malicious nodes in decentralized overlay networks.

Offline reputation management shapes public perception of a said entity outside the digital sphere using select clearly defined controls and measures towards a desired result ideally representing what stakeholders think and feel about that entity. The most popular controls for off-line reputation management include social responsibility, media visibility, press releases in print media and sponsorship amongst related tools.

In the 2010s, marketing a company and promoting their products online have become large components of business strategies.  Companies are trying to be more aware of how they are perceived by their audiences both inside and outside their target market.  A problem which often arises from this is false advertising.  In the past, contribution of internet posts and blogs to a company would have been a foreign concept to most corporations and their consumers.  However, with more competitors and more clutter, it is increasingly difficult to get noticed and become popular within the realm of online business or among influencers because of how the algorithms work on social media.

Reputation management is a marketing technique used to restore lost reputations by companies who have lost it, or to establish a  new one.

History
Reputation is a social construct based on the opinion other people hold about a person or thing. Before the internet was developed, consumers wanting to learn about a company had fewer options. They had access to resources such as the Yellow Pages, but mostly relied on word-of-mouth. A company's reputation depended on personal experience. A company while it grew and expanded was subject to the market's perception of the brand. Public relations were developed to manage the image and manage the reputation of a company or individual. The concept was initially created to broaden public relations outside of media relations. Academic studies have identified it as a driving force behind Fortune 500 corporate public relations since the beginning of the 21st century.

Originally, public relations included printed media, events and networking campaigns. At the end of 90s search engines became widely used. The popularity of the internet introduced new marketing and branding opportunities. Where once journalists were the main source of media content, blogs, review sites and social media gave a voice to consumers regardless of qualification. Public relations became part of online reputation management (ORM). ORM includes traditional reputation strategies of public relations but also focuses on building a long-term reputation strategy that is consistent across all web-based channels and platforms. ORM includes search engine reputation management which is designed to counter negative search results and elevate positive content.

Some businesses have adopted unethical means to falsely improve their reputations. In 2007, a study by the University of California Berkeley found that some sellers on eBay were undertaking reputation management by selling products at a discount in exchange for positive feedback to game the system.

Online reputation management

Reputation management (sometimes referred to as rep management or ORM) is the practice of attempting to shape public perception of a person or organization by influencing information about that entity, primarily online. What necessitates this shaping of perceptions being the role of consumers in any organization and the cognizance of how much if ignored these perceptions may harm a company's performance at any time of the year, a risk no entrepreneur or company executive can afford.

Specifically, reputation management involves the monitoring of the reputation of an individual or a brand on the internet, primarily focusing on the various social media platforms such as Facebook, Instagram, Youtube, etc. addressing content which is potentially damaging to it, and using customer feedback to try to solve problems before they damage the individual's or brand's reputation. A major part of reputation management involves suppressing negative search results, while highlighting positive ones. For businesses, reputation management usually involves an attempt to bridge the gap between how a company perceives itself and how others view it.

In 2012, there had been an article released titled "Social Media Research in Advertising, Communication, Marketing and Public Relations" written by Hyoungkoo Khang et-al. The references to Kaplan and Haenleins theory of social presence, highlights the "concept of self-presentation."

Khang highlights that “companies must monitor individual's comments regarding service 24/7." This can imply that the reputation of a company does essentially rely on the consumer, as they are the ones that can make or break it. People of the internet do not rely their trust on advertisements, rather it is the reviews of others that often sells a product. The question at hand is if it is ethical to follow influencers who are often portraying a clean slate lifestyle and promoting products or services they don't believe in. However, in recent times, the backlash of this is more apparent, an example being Instagram models who advertise ‘fit-teas’ to appear more slimmer, have been accused of being the stem of societal beauty pressures and seen as harmful to the youth. What Khang deliberates, is actually ironic. How a social influencer holds this power of essentially influencing their products and opinions on their audiences or even society, whereas on the other hand, the audiences have a ‘power’ to sometimes even destroy a career because of backlash.

Good management for companies
A fast-growing discipline and corporate necessity, reputation management is widely acknowledged as a valuable intangible asset which can be one of the most important sources of competitive edge in a fiercely competitive market, and with firms under scrutiny from the business community, regulators, and corporate governance watchdogs; good reputation management practices continues to help firms cope with this scrutiny.

Other benefits of sound reputation management practices is how much they reinforce and aid a corporation's branding objectives which on their own along the way play a paramount role in helping a company meet its marketing and business communication objectives, a key driver towards how much any company can go towards increasing profits and its market share. Good reputation management practices are helping any entity manage staff confidence as a control tool on public perceptions which if undermined and ignored can be costly, which in the long run may cripple employee confidence, a risk no employer would dare explore as staff morale is one of the most important drivers of company performance.

Reputation management campaigns in popular media

In 2011, controversy around the Taco Bell restaurant chain arose when public accusations were made that their "seasoned beef" product was only made up of only 35% real beef. A class action lawsuit was filed by the law firm Beasley Allen against Taco Bell. The suit was voluntarily withdrawn with Beasley Allen citing that "From the inception of this case, we stated that if Taco Bell would make certain changes regarding disclosure and marketing of its 'seasoned beef' product, the case could be dismissed." Taco Bell responded to the case being withdrawn by launching a reputation management campaign titled "Would it kill you to say you're sorry?" that ran advertisements in various news outlets in print and online, which attempted to draw attention to the voluntary withdrawal of the case.

Examples
Organisations often attempt to manage their reputations on websites that many people visit, such as eBay, Wikipedia, and Google. Some of the tactics used by reputation management firms include:

 Modifying the way results from searches are displayed on a search engine such as white papers and make appear in priority positive customer testimonials in order to push down negative content.
 Publishing original, positive websites and social media profiles, with the aim of outperforming negative results in a search.
 Submitting online press releases to authoritative websites in order to promote brand presence and suppress negative content.
 Submitting legal take-down requests if they have or pretend to have been libeled.
 Getting mentions of the business or individual on third-party sites that rank highly on Google.
 Creating fake, positive reviews of the individual or business to counteract negative ones.
 Using spambots and denial-of-service attacks to force sites with damaging content off the web entirely.
 Astroturfing third-party websites by creating anonymous accounts that create positive reviews or lash out against negative ones.
 Proactively offering free products to prominent reviewers.
 Removing online mug shots.
 Proactively responding to public criticism stemming from recent changes.
 Removing or suppressing images that are embarrassing or violate copyright.
 Contacting Wikipedia editors to remove allegedly incorrect information from the Wikipedia pages of businesses they represent.
 Forbidding any comments

Ethics
The practice of reputation management raises many ethical questions. It is widely disagreed upon where the line for disclosure, astroturfing, and censorship should be drawn. Firms have been known to hire staff to pose as bloggers on third-party sites without disclosing they were paid, and some have been criticized for asking websites to remove negative posts. The exposure of unethical reputation management may itself be risky to the reputation of a firm that attempts it if known.

Google declares there to be nothing inherently wrong with reputation management, and even introduced a toolset in 2011 for users to monitor their online identity and request the removal of unwanted content. Many firms are selective about clients they accept. For example, they may avoid individuals who committed violent crimes who are looking to push information about their crimes lower on search results.

In 2010, a study showed that Naymz, one of the first Web 2.0 services to provide utilities for Online Reputation Management (ORM), had developed a method to assess the online reputation of its members (RepScore) that was rather easy to deceive. The study found that the highest level of online reputation was easily achieved by engaging a small social group of nine persons who connect with each other and provide reciprocal positive feedbacks and endorsements. As of December 2017, Naymz was shut down.

In 2015, the online retailer Amazon.com sued 1,114 people who were paid to publish fake five-star reviews for products. These reviews were created using a website for Macrotasking, Fiverr.com. Several other companies offer fake Yelp and Facebook reviews, and one journalist amassed five-star reviews for a business that doesn't exist, from social media accounts that have also given overwhelmingly positive reviews to "a chiropractor in Arizona, a hair salon in London, a limo company in North Carolina, a realtor in Texas, and a locksmith in Florida, among other far-flung businesses".

In 2016, the Washington Post detailed 25 court cases, at least 15 of which had false addresses for the defendant. The court cases had similar language and the defendant agreed to the injunction by the plaintiff, which allowed the reputation management company to issue takedown notices to Google, Yelp, Leagle, Ripoff Report, various news sites, and other websites.

See also

 Brand safety
 Censorship
 Greenwashing
 Impression management
 Online identity management
 Peer-to-peer § Security and trust
 Reputation capital
 Reputation laundering
 Reputation marketing
 Reputation system
 Sentiment analysis
 Smear campaign
 Sockpuppet
 Spin (propaganda)
 Streisand effect
 Libel

References

External links
Reputation Management: The Future of Corporate Communications and Public Relations, Tony Langham, Emerald Group Publishing, (2018), 
Reputation Management: The Key to Successful Public Relations and Corporate Communication, John Doorley, Helio Fred Garcia, Routledge, (2011), 
Reputation Management: Building and Protecting Your Company's Profile in a Digital World, Andrew Hiles, AC Black (2011), 
Reputation Management, Sabrina Helm, Kerstin Liehr-Gobbers, Christopher Storck, Springer Science & Business Media (2011), 

 
Technology in society
Social information processing
Mass media monitoring
Social influence